Cottonwood Springs Dam is a dam in Fall River County, South Dakota in the southwestern part of the state, south of the Black Hills.

The earthen dam was constructed in 1969 by the U.S. Army Corps of Engineers with a height of 123 feet and a length at its crest of 1190 feet.  It impounds Cottonwood Springs Creek for area flood control.

The reservoir it creates, Cottonwood Springs Lake, has a water surface of 36 acres and has a maximum capacity of 11,635 acre-feet.  Recreation is year-round and includes camping, hiking, and fishing. Recreation is managed by the Corps of Engineers.

The dam and lake is approximately 6 miles west of Hot Springs, South Dakota. Cold Brook Dam, another Corps of Engineers dam is located about 5 miles northeast.

The dam and reservoir are located within the Cheyenne River watershed.

See also
U.S. Army Corps of Engineers
Black Hills National Forest

External links
Cottonwood Springs Lake Recreation
U.S. Army Corps of Engineers, Cottonwood Springs Dam

References 

Dams in South Dakota
Reservoirs in South Dakota
United States Army Corps of Engineers dams
Buildings and structures in Fall River County, South Dakota
Dams completed in 1969
Bodies of water of Fall River County, South Dakota